Hammerstad is a surname. Notable people with the surname include:

Hans Laurits Olsen Hammerstad (1840–1877), Norwegian politician
John Olsen Hammerstad (1842–1925), Norwegian-born American painter 
Oddmund Hammerstad (born 1942), Norwegian military officer, businessperson and politician
Ole Larsen Hammerstad (1817–1873), Norwegian politician